Jim Guyatt (5 September 1939 – 2 July 1996) was an Australian rules footballer who played with St Kilda in the Victorian Football League (VFL).

Notes 		
1962 Victorian state team V’s South Australia in Adelaide

External links 		

		
		
		
1939 births		
1996 deaths		
Australian rules footballers from Victoria (Australia)		
St Kilda Football Club players
Maffra Football Club players